Zakpo: Monatsschrift für Zeitkunst, Zeitbetrachtung, Satire und Karikatur ("Zakpo: monthly journal of contemporary art, viewing of the times, satire and caricature") was an artists'  magazine published in 1930 in Karlsruhe, Germany, by the actor Hermann Brand and the artists Karl Hubbuch, Erwin Spuler and Anton Weber who had been art students at Badischen Landeskunstschule in Karlsruhe. Two issues were published, in May and June 1930.

Contributors were Hermann Brand, Karl Hubbuch, Erwin Spuler, Anton Weber, Martha Kuhn, Hermann Trautwein, Stefan Walz and others. Hubbuch and Spuler wrote much of the material under the pseudonyms Boris Burawoy, Booby Neeter, Franz Radek, and Pierre Raquet.

The cover of the first issue was a lithograph by Spuler, depicting a gargantuan creature standing astride a river that runs through a city. The creature's torso is a building from which tiny figures are falling or leaping. Three men stand on the building's balcony, one of whom holds a megaphone. A banner on the building reads, Ausverkauf—Weisse woch(e) ("sellout—white sale").

The meaning of the word Zakpo was never explained in the pages of the journal, but has been interpreted as an acronym or an abbreviation: the art historian Wolfgang Grape has suggested that the two last letters may allude to politik ("politics") or polizei ("police"), while others have proposed Zeitschrift Aktiver Kommunistischer Partei Opposition ("Magazine active in communist party opposition").

In 1980, a facsimile was issued in an edition of 500 numbered copies, with an introduction by Wolfgang Grape.

Notes

References
Michalski, Sergiusz (1994). New Objectivity. Cologne: Benedikt Taschen. 
Spuler, E., Bieber, S., Rödiger-Diruf, E., & Merkel, U. (2001). Erwin Spuler Maler, Zeichner, Graphiker, Plastiker, Photograph, Filmemacher. Karlsruhe: Städtische Galerie.  (German language)
 Hans-Jürgen Tast (Hrsg.): Anton Weber. Der  Kunstfotograf. Hörspiel und Porträt-Aufnahmen. Schellerten 2004, .
 Hans-Jürgen Tast (Hrsg.): Anton Weber (1904–1979) - Filmarchitekt bei der UFA. Schellerten 2005, .

External links
Stadtwiki Karlsruhe German language

1930 establishments in Germany
1930 disestablishments in Germany
Defunct magazines published in Germany
German-language magazines
Magazines established in 1930
Magazines disestablished in 1930
Mass media in Karlsruhe
Monthly magazines published in Germany
Satirical magazines published in Germany
Visual arts magazines published in Germany